Ericson Jorge Silva Rodrigues Duarte (born 25 November 1987), known simply as Ericson, is a Cape Verdean professional footballer who plays for Portuguese club Vilaverdense F.C. as a defensive midfielder.

Club career
Born in São Vicente, Ericson spent his entire professional career in Portugal, starting out at G.D. Chaves in the third division. In the Segunda Liga, he represented C.D. Tondela, Chaves, C.D. Aves, F.C. Arouca, F.C. Vizela and Académico de Viseu FC.

Ericson's only season in the Primeira Liga was 2014–15, in service of Vitória de Setúbal. He played his first match in the competition on 24 August 2014, in a 2–0 home win against Gil Vicente F.C. where he came on as a 46th-minute substitute for Jucie Lupeta.

References

External links

1987 births
Living people
People from São Vicente, Cape Verde
Cape Verdean footballers
Association football midfielders
Primeira Liga players
Liga Portugal 2 players
Segunda Divisão players
G.D. Chaves players
C.D. Pinhalnovense players
Merelinense F.C. players
SC Mirandela players
C.D. Tondela players
Vitória F.C. players
C.D. Aves players
F.C. Arouca players
F.C. Vizela players
Académico de Viseu F.C. players
Vilaverdense F.C. players
Cape Verde international footballers
Cape Verdean expatriate footballers
Expatriate footballers in Portugal
Cape Verdean expatriate sportspeople in Portugal